This is a list of the Australian moth species of the family Opostegidae. It also acts as an index to the species articles and forms part of the full List of moths of Australia.

Opostega arthrota Meyrick, 1915
Opostega atypa Turner, 1923
Opostega basilissa Meyrick, 1893
Opostega brithys Turner, 1923
Opostega chalcoplethes Turner, 1923
Opostega chalinias Meyrick, 1893
Opostega chordacta Meyrick, 1915
Opostega diorthota Meyrick, 1893
Opostega horaria Meyrick, 1921
Opostega luticilia Meyrick, 1915
Opostega monotypa Turner, 1923
Opostega nubifera Turner, 1900
Opostega orestias Meyrick, 1880
Opostega phaeospila Turner, 1923
Opostega scoliozona Meyrick, 1915
Opostega stiriella Meyrick, 1880
Opostega xenodoxa Meyrick, 1893
Opostegoides gephyraea (Meyrick, 1880)

External links 
Opostegidae at Australian Faunal Directory

Australia
Opostegidae